Bruno David Roma (born 26 July 1989) is a Brazilian professional footballer who plays as a midfielder. He stands 1.77m tall.

Career
Born in Santo André, Roma moved from Pão de Açúcar to Dutch team Helmond Sport in January 2007, making 26 appearances in the league before leaving in 2009.

References

1989 births
Living people
Association football midfielders
Brazilian footballers
Eerste Divisie players
Expatriate footballers in the Netherlands
Helmond Sport players
People from Santo André, São Paulo
Footballers from São Paulo (state)